Breznik is a settlement southwest of Izlake in the Municipality of Zagorje ob Savi in central Slovenia. The area is part of the traditional region of Upper Carniola. It is now included with the rest of the municipality in the Central Sava Statistical Region.

Name
Breznik was attested in written sources as Bressnikg in 1444, among other spellings.

References

External links

Breznik on Geopedia

Populated places in the Municipality of Zagorje ob Savi